Williams v Hensman (1861) is an English trusts law case.

Its principles of co-owned interests are today more relevant to land, whether from a trust now held as joint tenants (the default form) or as tenants in common (which follows on from express words such as "in equal shares" or from severance); in law all co-owned land in England and Wales must be held in either form.

It sets out the three means of severance.

Facts
Money was bequeathed to be invested in stock, and to pay an annuity to A, with the ‘principal to go to her children at death.’ All eight children consented to money being invested in a mortgage fund. Three were minors. They could not end the trust until they all grew up under the rule in Saunders v Vautier. The trustee, with full agreement, advanced a sum to one of the children, and the other children covenanted: not to call upon the trustee to make up any deficiency (to them) in case the shares held for them ("the share") should fall short of the advance (made to the other child), and also to indemnify the trustee against all claim(s), damage and expenses by reason of the advance.

The question was whether the beneficiaries of the trust was still co-owned jointly tenancy.

Judgment
The Chancery Court held it was a joint tenancy. And the act of the five severed their interest from the other three. Page-Wood VC decided:.

Applied in
Barton v Morris [1985] 1 WLR 1257; [1985] 2 All ER 1032, EWHC Ch D

Considered in
Harris v Goddard [1983] 1 WLR 1203; [1983] 3 All ER 242, EWCA

See also

English trusts law
English land law
English property law

Notes and References

1861 in England
1861 in case law
English trusts case law
English land case law
1861 in British law
Court of Chancery cases